Top Country Albums is a chart that ranks the top-performing country music albums in the United States, published by Billboard.  In 1988, 11 different albums topped the chart, based on sales reports submitted by a representative sample of stores nationwide.

In the issue of Billboard dated January 2, Randy Travis was at number one with the album Always & Forever, its 26th week in the top spot.  Three weeks later the album broke the previous record of 28 weeks at number one set by the band Alabama with both Feels So Right and Mountain Music between 1981 and 1983.  Always & Forever would ultimately spend a total of 43 weeks at number one; its record would stand until Shania Twain spent 50 weeks atop the chart with Come On Over between 1997 and 2000.  Two months after Always & Forever finally left the top spot, Travis returned to number one with Old 8x10, which would spend eight weeks atop the chart in 1988 and double that figure early the following year.  The singer would achieve a fourth consecutive number one in 1989 before his chart performance began to decline in the subsequent decade.

In addition to Travis, Ricky Van Shelton had two number ones in 1988.  After years of playing small venues while working a day job, Shelton had secured his first major-label record deal in 1986 at the age of 34.  His debut album, Wild-Eyed Dream, entered the Top Country Albums chart in March 1987 and took an entire year to reach number one, finally topping the chart in its 52nd week on the listing.  Shelton returned to number one in November with Loving Proof, which spent the final nine weeks of 1988 in the top spot.  K. T. Oslin also topped the chart for the first time in 1988; she spent the sole week of her career at number one when 80's Ladies topped the listing in the issue of Billboard dated February 27.

Chart history

References

1988
1988 record charts